"Dizzy" is a song originally recorded by Tommy Roe; it became an international hit single in 1969. Instrumental backing was provided by the Los Angeles session musicians known as the Wrecking Crew.

Co-written by Roe and Freddy Weller, "Dizzy" was a major hit on both sides of the Atlantic, reaching number one on the U.S. Billboard Hot 100 for four weeks in March 1969, for one week on the UK Singles Chart in June 1969, and was number one in Canada in March 1969.

It was subsequently recorded by such disparate artists as Boney M, Wreckless Eric, and Billy J. Kramer. A 1991 cover by Vic Reeves and The Wonder Stuff reached number one in the UK Singles Chart.

Personnel
 Tommy Roe – vocals
 Hal Blaine – drums
 Joe Osborn – bass
 Ben Benay – guitar
 Michael Deasy – guitar
 Don Randi – piano (On AFM Contract)
 Jimmie Haskell – string arrangement

Charts

Weekly charts

All-time charts

Vic Reeves version

On October 14, 1991, a cover of "Dizzy" recorded by English comedian Vic Reeves and alternative rock band the Wonder Stuff was released in the United Kingdom, reaching number one in the UK Singles Chart and staying there for two weeks. It was a top-three hit in Australia, peaking at number three. "Dizzy" also charted in Austria, Ireland, and New Zealand. This version added another key change to the 11 that already exist (from F major to G major).

The music video features Reeves and the band performing on stage, with a row of washing machines and microwave ovens in the background instead of amplifiers (a visual pun on the well-known Whirlpool brand of washing machine). Vic's comedy partner Bob Mortimer appears in the background with Wonder Stuff frontman Miles Hunt, playing a tambourine and singing backing vocals.

Reeves and the band, together with Mortimer, performed the song on BBC's Top of the Pops on 24 October 1991.

Charts

Weekly charts

Year-end charts

Certifications

References

1968 songs
1969 singles
1991 singles
ABC Records singles
Billboard Hot 100 number-one singles
Cashbox number-one singles
Island Records singles
Songs written by Tommy Roe
Songs written by Freddy Weller
Tommy Roe songs
UK Singles Chart number-one singles
Song recordings produced by Mick Glossop